Orehova Vas is a settlement in the Municipality of Hoče–Slivnica in northeastern Slovenia. It lies on the edge of the flatlands on the right bank of the Drava River south of Maribor. The area is part of the traditional region of Styria. The municipality is now included in the Drava Statistical Region.

A chapel-shrine in the village dates to the early 20th century.

The terminal building and much of the runway of Maribor Edvard Rusjan Airport is located at Orehova Vas.

References

External links

Orehova Vas on Geopedia

Populated places in the Municipality of Hoče-Slivnica